Baldwinsville is a village in Onondaga County, New York, United States. The population was 7,898 at the 2020 census. It is part of the Syracuse Metropolitan Statistical Area.

Baldwinsville (the village itself) is located in the towns of Lysander and Van Buren.  Baldwinsville mailing addresses also include a small northwestern section of the town of Clay.

History 
The village is named after Dr. Jonas Baldwin, who built a dam across the Seneca River to generate energy and a private canal to keep the integrity of the water highway. It incorporated in 1848 as the Village of Baldwinsville. Prior to this, the community was known by a number of other names, including McHarrie's Rifts.

Baldwinsville initially grew as a local center for a prosperous farming area, with numerous mills along the north and south shores of the Seneca River. A canal on the north shore of the river allowed boats to navigate around the dam. In the early 1900s this canal was superseded with the construction of the New York State Barge Canal on the south shore of the river. In the early 1900s the village was also served by the Erie Lackawanna Railway, connecting Baldwinsville to the cities of Syracuse and Oswego. In addition to agriculture, Baldwinsville had small factories, such as Morris Machine Works, Jardine Bronze Foundry, and others. A large brewery now owned by Anheuser-Busch was constructed immediately east of the village in the mid-1970s to take advantage of ample water supplies from Lake Ontario. As agriculture and industry have receded, Baldwinsville has evolved into an attractive riverside community.

Grace Episcopal Church, formerly of Elizabeth Street, was one of the first churches in the United States to use electric lighting.

Dozens of local farm boys are listed on the Civil War monument in the village cemetery along the Seneca River, having served and died in several units of the Union Army. Those listed on this monument served under General John A. Logan as part of William T. Sherman's army. Other units included 1st Regiment, Light Artillery, N. Y. S. Volunteers, Battery B (Pettit's Battery) which fought at many major battles, including:

 Antietam, Md. September 15–17, 1862.
 Battle of Fredericksburg December 12–17, 1862.
 Battle of Chancellorsville May 1–3, 1863.
 Battle of Gettysburg July 2–3, 1863.
 Battle of Spotsylvania May 12, 1864.
 Petersburg, Virginia June 16–20, 1864.

The Baldwinsville Village Hall, Mrs. I. L. Crego House, and Oswego-Oneida Streets Historic District are listed on the National Register of Historic Places.

Government 
The mayor is Richard Clarke and the deputy mayor is Bruce Stebbins. The Board of trustees includes Mayor Richard Clarke, Deputy Mayor Bruce Stebbins, Ruth Cico, Megan O'Donnell, Mike Shepard, Nathan Collins, and Eric Reinagel.

Education 

The village has a public school district named after it; it has one high school (C.W. Baker High School), one middle school (Donald S. Ray Middle School), one junior high school (Theodore R. Durgee Junior High School), and five elementary schools (Harry E. Elden, Catherine McNamara, L. Pearl Palmer, Mae E. Reynolds and Martin Van Buren). One of the districts goals is to be an inclusive and fair environment and to accept all students of different cultures, ethnicity, etc. A number of parochial schools are also located there.  Baldwinsville Christian Academy, a private Christian school, is located just outside the village on Van Buren Rd.  Another Private Christian School, Word of Life Christian Academy is located in the Village on East Oneida Street.

The Baldwinsville sports teams are nicknamed the "B’ville Bees," and have had some recent success, especially in Girls' Volleyball (2010 New York State Champions, 2006, 2009 & 2011 New York State Semi-Finalists, and 2006, 2008, 2009, 2010, 2011 Section 3 Champs), 2008 Boys' Cross Country (6th ranked team in the state), and Boys' Soccer (2007 & 2008 Section 3 Champions). The Baldwinsville Marching Band won the 2000, 2001, 2004, 2009 and 2012 State Championship in the NYSFBC's Large School 2 Class, 2nd place in 2006, and won the 2007 Toyota Gator Bowl in Florida. The 2010 band won the Delaware/Maryland Championships in Baltimore, and the 2011 band won every category but one at the 2012 Gator Bowl. The Baldwinsville Varsity Winterguard won the 2002 and 2004 State Championships in the MYCGC's SA2 class, and the 2009 State Championship in the SRA class. The girls' soccer team was the first team from CNY to ever win the Class A State Championships in 2002.

In 2012 and 2013, the boys' varsity baseball team won Sectional and Regional Championships; in 2013, the team won the Class AA New York State Championship and were ranked #1 in the Northeast by MaxPreps.

In recent years, the Bees hockey program has experienced success. In 2005, the team reached the Frozen Four but lost in the state championship, finishing ranked number 2 in the state.  In 2009, the team finished the season Section 3 Division 1 champions and were ranked 7th in the state. In 2010, the Bees made it to the section finals and finished the year ranked 14th.

Additionally, both the boys and girls varsity lacrosse teams won the New York State Class A championship in 2022.

Baldwinsville school district has also been named one of the best districts for music Education for the 12th year in a row. The Baldwinsville Marching Bees had great success in visiting the Rose Parade in Pasadena, California (2020). The school Musicals such as Peter Pan, Shrek the musical, and Mary Poppins have also had great ticket sales and great success.

Culture 
Several community festivals are held each year.  The Baldwinsville Oktoberfest, a festival that celebrates the village and surrounding community is held every September to raise funds for a variety of not-for-profit causes in the Baldwinsville community.  The Rotary Club organizes the Seneca River Days festival (formerly the John McHarrie Day festival) occurs in June; it features an anything that floats race, which encourages entrants to build a floating vehicle without spending more than a set amount (currently $50). Many functions are held at the amphitheater on Paper Mill Island. There have been several local, regional and national bands playing on weekends throughout the summer months. A 9/11 memorial was completed and presented to the community on the 10 year anniversary of the September 11 attacks in New York City.

Geography 
Baldwinsville is located at  (43.1599, -76.3346). The village is located on the Seneca River, which flows through the village, through the historic downtown area and forms a section of the Erie Canal. Its 24th lock sports a local restaurant which is popular for guests.

Baldwinsville is located on gently rolling hills, nearby Lake Ontario and the Finger Lakes. It lies in a transitional zone between the nearly flat plain immediately adjacent to Lake Ontario, and the hills to the south that form the approaches to the Allegheny Mountains of southern New York and northern Pennsylvania. This rolling glacial terrain is intersected and divided by forests, meadows, farmland, and bodies of water of all types, which is marked by significant seasonal variations. Local soils are a rich and varied blend, with deposits of gravels, sands, and rock flour, ground up and tilled by the glaciers, and left behind as they receded to the north. As is typical of the Great Lakes plains, these varied soils and gentle slopes create ideal conditions for specialty agriculture, orchards, and vegetable farming. The "lake effect" moderates the harsh Arctic winters found on the north side of Lake Ontario, but this comes at a price. Snowfall in the region is the highest for any metropolitan area in the United States. High average rainfall and snowfall result in abundant water resources.

Baldwinsville is in a region of rivers, lakes, streams, swamps, marshes, creeks, and ponds. Local forests, while predominantly hardwoods such as Sugar Maple, are also widely variable due to the variations in soil, drainage, and microclimate. Nearly every tree species found in the northeastern United States can be found in the forests near Baldwinsville. Wildlife is abundant, and many varieties of fish are found in the local waters in the Seneca River.  Because the Seneca River flows to Lake Ontario by way of the Oswego River, the introduction of the invasive Zebra Mussel by international shipping in the Great Lakes has had significant ecological effects on the river, for example, a dramatic improvement in clarity and a consequent flourishing of aquatic vegetation along the banks.

Climate
This climatic region is typified by large seasonal temperature differences, with warm to (comfortably) hot summers and cold (sometimes severely cold) winters that seem to last over half of a year.  According to the Köppen Climate Classification system, Baldwinsville has a humid continental climate, abbreviated "Dfb" on climate maps.

Demographics 

As of the census of 2000, there were 7,053 people, 2,801 households, and 1,837 families residing in the village. The population density was 2,291.7 people per square mile (884.1/km2). There were 2,924 housing units at an average density of 950.1 per square mile (366.5/km2). The racial makeup of the village was 96.87% White, 0.75% African American, 0.51% Native American, 0.67% Asian, 0.03% Pacific Islander, 0.17% from other races, and 1.01% from two or more races. Hispanic or Latino of any race were 0.79% of the population.

There were 2,801 households, out of which 34.2% had children under the age of 18 living with them, 50.3% were married couples living together, 11.7% had a female householder with no husband present, and 34.4% were non-families. 28.9% of all households were made up of individuals, and 14.7% had someone living alone who was 65 years of age or older. The average household size was 2.46 and the average family size was 3.05.

In the village, the population was spread out, with 26.6% under the age of 18, 6.6% from 18 to 24, 29.5% from 25 to 44, 21.7% from 45 to 64, and 15.7% who were 65 years of age or older. The median age was 37 years. For every 100 females, there were 88.6 males. For every 100 females age 18 and over, there were 82.8 males.

The median income for a household in the village was $41,143, and the median income for a family was $51,549. Males had a median income of $37,259 versus $25,740 for females. The per capita income for the village was $19,817. About 5.6% of families and 8.2% of the population were below the poverty line, including 9.2% of those under age 18 and 9.2% of those age 65 or over.

Notable people 
 Marty Ashby, jazz guitarist and music producer
 William Martin Beauchamp, ethnologist and clergyman, rector of Grace Episcopal Church in Baldwinsville (1865–1900); made valuable archæological research, particularly concerning Haudenosaunee or Iroquois, publishing his findings in eight books between 1892 and 1908
 Tim Connolly, professional ice hockey player, fifth overall pick of 1999 NHL Entry Draft
 Jason Grilli, professional baseball pitcher for the Texas Rangers and Toronto Blue Jays
 Don Paige, 1980 Olympic team member: 800m, former world record holder 1,000 yards
 George Sullivan, football player of 1920s
 Robert Starling Pritchard, concert pianist, humanitarian, originated Black History Month
 Cristoval Nieves, professional hockey player for NHL's Tampa Bay Lightning
 Alex Bono, professional soccer player, goalkeeper for Toronto FC
 Alex Tuch, professional hockey player for Buffalo Sabres; first-round selection of 2014 NHL Draft
 Christine Hallquist, Democratic candidate for  Governor of Vermont in 2018.
 Benjamin Gerardi, founder of Farm Swarming INC and Fulbright Award-winner

References

External links

 Village of Baldwinsville official website
 1st Artillery Regiment (Light) Civil War Morgan's Light Artillery 
 Greater Baldwinsville - By Sue Ellen McManus, 2010

Villages in New York (state)
Syracuse metropolitan area
Populated places established in 1798
Villages in Onondaga County, New York
1798 establishments in New York (state)